Calcium citrate malate is a water-soluble calcium supplement. It is the calcium salt of citric acid and malic acid with variable composition.

Calcium citrate malate's bioavailability stems from its water-solubility and its method of dissolution. When dissolved, it releases calcium ions and a calcium citrate complex. Calcium ions are absorbed directly into intestinal cells, and the citrate complex enters the body through paracellular absorption.

Calcium citrate malate is similar to calcium malate and other calcium salts.  The European Food Safety Authority has concluded that calcium citrate malate is "slightly more bioavailable" than other forms of calcium supplementation.

References

Citrates
Calcium compounds
Malates